Vollore-Montagne is a commune in the Puy-de-Dôme department in Auvergne in central France.

See also
Communes of the Puy-de-Dôme department

References

External links
 La Gazette des Montagnards, Vollore-Montagne (63120)

Volloremontagne